Fairview Township is a township in Shelby County, Iowa. There are 194 people and 4.9 people per square mile in Fairview Township. The total area is 39.4 square miles.

References

Townships in Shelby County, Iowa
Townships in Iowa